East New Britain is a province of Papua New Guinea, consisting of the north-eastern part of the island of New Britain and the Duke of York Islands. The capital of the province is Kokopo, not far from the old capital of Rabaul, which was largely destroyed in a volcanic eruption in 1994. The province's only land border is with West New Britain Province to the west, and it also shares a maritime border with New Ireland Province to the east.

East New Britain has a dual economy: a cash economy operates side by side with the subsistence-farming sector. The main crops produced for export are cocoa and copra. Tourism continues to be an increasingly important sector of the provincial economy.

Languages
There are sixteen Austronesian languages spoken in the province, of which Kuanua, spoken by the Tolai on the Gazelle Peninsula is the most widely spoken. Papuan languages are also spoken in the province, including the Baining, Taulil, Ata, Kol, Makolkol, and Sulka languages.

Districts and LLGs
Each province in Papua New Guinea has one or more districts, and each district has one or more Local Level Government (LLG) areas. For census purposes, the LLG areas are subdivided into wards and those into census units.

Provincial leaders

The province was governed by a decentralised provincial administration, headed by a Premier, from 1977 to 1995. Following reforms taking effect that year, the national government reassumed some powers, and the role of Premier was replaced by a position of Governor, to be held by the winner of the province-wide seat in the National Parliament of Papua New Guinea.

Premiers (1978–1995)

Governors (1995–present)

Members of the National Parliament

The province and each district is represented by a Member of the National Parliament.  There is one provincial electorate and each district is an open electorate.

See also

Bismarck Archipelago

References

External links
East New Britain Tourism & Trade Directory
East New Britain Provincial Administration
PNG National Game Fishing Titles Rabaul 2008

 

Islands Region (Papua New Guinea)
Provinces of Papua New Guinea